Too Careful is the second EP by the Australian power pop band End of Fashion. It was released on 1 November 2004 on the Capitol Records label.

The songs "Too Careful" and "Love Comes In" were later re-recorded for End of Fashion's self-titled debut album.

Reception
Andrew Murfett in the Sydney Morning Herald believed that "on their latest release, Too Careful, End of Fashion have crafted two superb rock songs - the title track and "You and Only You"."

Track listing

Credits
End of Fashion
 Rodney Aravena - guitar, keyboards, backing vocals  
 Justin Burford - vocals, guitar, keyboards, percussion 
 Mike Hobbs - drums, backing vocals
 Hugh Jennings - bass, backing vocals, keyboards

Additional musicians
 Joel Quartermain - keyboards, percussion, backing vocals 
 Andy Lawson - slide guitar, backing vocals

Technical Personnel
 Ben Quinn - cover art
 Sean O'Callaghan - engineer (tracks 2-4) 
 Steve Smart - mastering
 Paul McKercher - producer (track 1), mixing
 Lee Yeoh - recording assistant, producing assistant (track 1)
 Debaser - producer (tracks 2-4)
 End Of Fashion - producer (tracks 2-4)

Facilities
 Recorded – Big Jesus Burger Studios
 Engineered – Studio Couch
 Produced – Big Jesus Burger Studios
 Mixed – Sing Sing Studios
 Mastered – Studios 301, Sydney

Charts

References

2004 EPs
End of Fashion albums
Capitol Records EPs